Keeping Mum is a British sitcom, written by Geoffrey Atherden and broadcast on BBC1 for two series between 1997 and 1998. It starred Stephanie Cole as the main character, Peggy Beare, Martin Ball and David Haig as her sons and Meera Syal as her daughter-in-law.

Main cast

Episodes

Series one

Series two

Reception
In his review for The Independent, Thomas Sutcliffe said that "Cole's performance is never just clownish", concluding his review by saying: "The result is a programme that is only intermittently funny, to be honest, but at least has larger ambitions for what popular comedy can do."

Home media
The entire series was released on DVD region 2 in 2007.

References

External links

BBC television sitcoms
1990s British sitcoms
Television series about families
1997 British television series debuts
1998 British television series endings